Pavlo Ihorovych Polehenko (born 6 January 1995) is a Ukrainian professional footballer who plays as a defender plays for Zorya Luhansk.

Career
Polehenko is a product of the Yunist Chernihiv and Dynamo Kyiv youth academies.

Loan to Hoverla Uzhhorod 
In July 2015, Polehenko went on loan to Hoverla Uzhhorod in the Ukrainian Premier League. On 19 July, He made his debut for the club against Dnipro Dnipropetrovsk.

Dynamo-2 Kyiv 
In 2015 he moved to Dynamo-2 Kyiv in the Ukrainian First League.

Zirka Kropyvnytskyi 
In 2016, Polehenko moved to Zirka Kropyvnytskyi in the Ukrainian Premier League.

Mariupol 
In 2018 he moved to Mariupol, where played for two seasons.

Desna Chernihiv 
In the summer of 2020 he signed a contract with Desna. On 4 October he made his debut with the new team against Shakhtar Donetsk at the Chernihiv Stadium. At the end of May 2021 his contract with Desna was ended by mutual agreement.

Inhulets Petrove
That same month, he signed for Inhulets Petrove. He made his debut for the club against Shakhtar Donetsk at the NSC Olimpiyskiy in Kyiv on 24 July 2021. On 10 December he scored his first league goal for Inhulets Petrove against Desna Chernihiv.

Lviv
In summer 2022 he moved to Lviv in the Ukrainian Premier League.

Zorya Luhansk
In March 2023 he signed for Zorya Luhansk.On 18 March 2023 he made his debut against Dynamo Kyiv at the Valeriy Lobanovskyi Dynamo Stadium.

Career statistics

Club

References

External links

1995 births
Living people
Footballers from Chernihiv
FC Yunist Chernihiv players
Ukrainian footballers
Ukraine youth international footballers
Association football defenders
Ukrainian Premier League players
Ukrainian First League players
FC Hoverla Uzhhorod players
FC Dynamo-2 Kyiv players
FC Zirka Kropyvnytskyi players
FC Mariupol players
FC Desna Chernihiv players
FC Inhulets Petrove players
FC Lviv players
Ukraine under-21 international footballers